Holly is an English-language surname and given name. 

Holly is known as an English or Irish surname (variant Holley) it is either locational, ultimately derived from the Old English hol lēah "[dwelling by] the clearing by the hollow", or descriptive, from hol-ēage "hollow-eyed". In Ireland, it was also used as a translation of the name Mac Cuilinn, which is derived from cuileann, the Gaelic name of the holly tree, and by extension sometimes of the similar-sounding  McQuillan surname of Ulster. The masculine names Holly, Hollie were derived from the surname, but have mostly fallen out of use since the mid 20th century due to the rise in popularity of the feminine name.  Hollis is an English surname derived from a Middle English holis "[dwelling by] holly trees"; it was also used as a masculine given name.

Holly (variants Hollie, Holley) was first used as a feminine given name in the 20th century, as a "botanical" name given to girls, in reference to, or at least secondarily associated with, the holly tree. While the feminine name is on record in the United States since the 1930s, its surge in popularity was due to Holly Golightly, the socialite protagonist in Truman Capote's Breakfast at Tiffany's (1958), which was made into a film starring Audrey Hepburn in 1961. The name of this character is stated to be short for Holiday (rather than a reference to the plant).
The name peaked in popularity in the United States in the 1970s and 1980s, and has declined since, ranking at #380 in the United States as of 2009. It was popularly given in England and Wales during the 2000s, staying in the top 30 girls' names throughout 1996–2012, with a peak at rank #12 in 2002 (and dropping to rank #33 as of 2013). A tendency to give the name to girls born on or near Christmas has also been observed. More recent eccentric spellings of the feminine name include Holli (1970s), Holleigh, Hollee, and Hollye.

Surname

Alanson Holly (1810-1882), American politician
Anton Holly (1875–1932), American politician
Birdsill Holly (1820–1894), American inventor
Buddy Holly (1936–1959), American rock and roll musician
Charles Frederick Holly (1819-1901), Justice of the Colorado Territorial Supreme Court
Christy Holly (b. 1984/85), Northern Ireland footballer and football coach
Daven Holly (b. 1982), American football player
Ed Holly (1879–1973), American baseball player
Lauren Holly (b. 1963), American actress

Pseudonym
The Holly Cousins, a kayfabe family in American professional wrestling:
 Hardcore Holly (born 1963)
 Crash Holly (1971–2003)
 Molly Holly (born 1977)

Given name

Feminine

 Holly Aird (b. 1969), British actress
 Holley Rubinsky (1943-2015), Canadian-American fiction writer
 Holly Black (b. 1971), American writer (Spiderwick Chronicles)
 Holly Cairns (b. 1989), Irish Social Democrat politician
 Holly Cole (b. 1963), Canadian jazz singer
 Holly Marie Combs (b. 1973), American actress
 Holly Dorger (b. 1989), American ballet dancer
 Holly Dunn (1957–2016), American country music singer-songwriter
 Holly Earl (b. 1992), British actress
 Holley Fain (b. 1981), American actress
 Holly Glynn (1966–1987), formerly unidentified American woman
 Holly Golightly Smith (b. 1966), British singer and songwriter
 Holly Holyoake (b. 1988), Welsh soprano
 Holly Hamilton, British journalist and presenter
 Holly Harris (born 2002), Australian figure skater 
 Holly Hunter (b. 1958), American actress
 Holly Jack, Scottish actress and acting coach
 Holly Jones, American restoration ecologist and conservation biologist
 Holly Jones (1992-2003), Canadian murder victim
 Holly Krieger, American mathematician
 Holly Lincoln (b. 1985), Canadian soccer forward
 Holly Madison, (b. 1979), American model
 Holley Mangold (b. 1989), American athlete
 Holly Miranda (b. 1983), American singer
 Holly Palance (b. 1950), American actress, daughter of veteran actor Jack Palance
 Holly Robinson Peete (b. 1964), American actress, singer and author
 Holly Piirainen (1983–1993), American murder victim
 Holly Rankin (born 1991), professional name of Jack River, Australian singer-songwriter
 Holly Ross, English musician
 Holly Roth (born 1916), American crime writer who disappeared at sea
 Holly Schepisi (born 1971), state Senator from New Jersey
 Holly Valance (née Vukadinović, b. 1983), Australian-British actress, singer and model
 Holly Walsh (b. 1980), British comedian
 Holly Willoughby (b. 1981), British television presenter
 Holly Humberstone, British singer-songwriter

Pseudonym
 Holly Golightly (comics) (b. 1964), American comic book writer and artist
 Holly Sampson (b. 1973), American porn performer
 Holly Woodlawn (1946-2015), Puerto Rican actress

Fictional characters
 Holly Flax, a character on The Office (2005)
 Holly Gennero-MaClane, a character from the Die Hard franchise (1988)
 Holly Golightly, the heroine in Truman Capote's Breakfast at Tiffany's (1958), made into a film starring Audrey Hepburn in 1961
 Holly Hobbie, American children character and pseudonym of the author (Denise Holly Ulinskas (b. 1944))
 Holly Holliday, a character from Glee, played by Gwyneth Paltrow (2009)
 Holly Faye Lovell, the main character in the 2004 ABC Family television movie titled Brave New Girl
 Holly Marshall, a character in 1974 TV series The Land of the Lost
 Holly (Red Dwarf), a central character on the British TV series Red Dwarf (1988) — the character is a computer and was played by a female actor in later series
 Holly Robinson, DC Comics character and a frequent ally and sidekick of Catwoman (1987)
 Holly Short, a character in the Artemis Fowl children's book series (2001)
 Holly J. Sinclair, a fictional character in Degrassi: The Next Generation (2001)
 Holly the Christmas Fairy, a character from the Rainbow Magic book franchise
 Holly Thompson, a character in the 1988 American science-fiction action thriller movie They Live
 Holly Wheeler, a character from Netflix TV Series Stranger Things
 Holly White, a character on AMC crime drama Breaking Bad (2008)
 Holly Wildwood, a character from Sylvanian Families
 Holly Vega, a recurring character from the Nickelodeon TV show Victorious
 Holly, a fictional character in the British CBeebies series Everything's Rosie
 Princess Holly, the titular protagonist in the British cartoon Ben and Holly's Little Kingdom

Masculine

Holly Broadbent Jr. (1918–2009), American orthodontist
Holly Broadbent Sr. (1894–1977), American orthodontist 
Holly One (1965–2006), Italian porn star
Holley Mims (1929–1970), American boxer
Holly B (1925–2016), Trinidad and Tobago radio and television personality
Holly Johnson (William Holly Johnson, b. 1960), English singer
Holly Campbell (1907–1979), American track and field athlete
Holly Hollingshead (1853–1926), Major League Baseball center fielder

Fictional characters
 Holly Martins, played by Joseph Cotten in Carol Reed's The Third Man (1949)
 Holly (Red Dwarf), a central character on the British TV series Red Dwarf (1988) — Holly was a computer and was originally played by a male actor

See also
 Holliday (name)

References

English given names
English feminine given names
Irish feminine given names
Scottish feminine given names
Welsh feminine given names